Elections to Ellesmere Port and Neston Borough Council were held on 7 May 1998.  One third of the council was up for election and the Labour Party stayed in overall control of the council.

After the election, the composition of the council was:
Labour 36
Conservative 5

Results

References
"Council poll results", The Guardian 9 May 1998 page 16

1998 English local elections
1998
1990s in Cheshire